Gantz (stylized as GANTZ) is a Japanese manga series written and illustrated by Hiroya Oku. It was serialized in Shueisha's seinen manga magazine Weekly Young Jump from June 2000 to June 2013, with its chapters collected in thirty-seven tankōbon volumes. It tells the story of Kei Kurono and Masaru Kato, both of whom died in a train accident and become part of a semi-posthumous "game" in which they and several other recently deceased people are forced to hunt down and kill aliens armed with a handful of futuristic items, equipment, and weaponry.

An anime television series adaptation, directed by Ichiro Itano and animated by Gonzo, was broadcast for 26 episodes, divided into two seasons, in 2004. A series of two live-action films based on the manga were produced and released in January and April 2011. A CGI anime film, Gantz: O, was released in 2016.

Plot

A pair of high school students, Kei Kurono and Masaru Kato, are hit by a subway train in an attempt to save the life of a drunk homeless man who had fallen onto the tracks. Following their deaths, Kurono and Kato find themselves transported to the interior of an unfurnished Tokyo apartment, where they meet Joichiro Nishi, a Gantz veteran, and other clueless participants. The pair soon realizes that they are not allowed to leave the apartment. At one end of the room there is a large black sphere known as "Gantz".

After some time in the room, the Gantz sphere opens up, revealing a bald naked man with a breathing mask and wires attached to his head, and various weapons for them to use. These include the custom fitting black suits which give them super-human strength, speed, stamina and damage resistance, a controller which acts as a radar and stealth unit, X-gun, X-Shotgun, Y-Gun. Later on the series the Gantz sword, Gantz Bike are made available as well as much more powerful weapons are awarded in the 100 point menu.

When the Gantz sphere opens, green text appears on its surface, informing those present that their "lives have ended and now belong to him". A picture and brief information is shown of some of the Gantz' targets; Gantz orders them to go and kill them. Except for a single mission, all the targets are aliens living on Earth, which take on a wide variety of forms. During the mission, normal people cannot see the players or the aliens. Gantz transports them to the area of the mission, and they cannot leave or return until all the enemies have been killed, or the time limit has run out. If they survive a successful mission, each individual is awarded points for the aliens they have killed. Once a participant has scored 100 points, a "100 point menu" will appear. The menu offers three options:
Option 1: The participant can return to their normal life, never having to be summoned by Gantz again. As a price, their memories of Gantz and the missions will be erased.
Option 2: The participant obtains a unique and extremely powerful weapon.
Option 3: The participant can revive someone who has died during a mission from Gantz' memory. This option appeared halfway through the series.

After a mission has been completed, points are tallied up, the participants are allowed to leave and do as they see fit until their next mission, with the exception of talking about Gantz, which would lead to their heads exploding. During Kurono and Kato's third mission, all the participants except Kurono are killed, however, Kato kills the last boss, giving Kurono a chance to survive. Kurono survives the third mission bleeding on the floor with his limbs cut apart. After the third mission Kurono starts to change inside, adopting a hero complex similar to Kato's personality. As the series continues, Kurono participates with the objective of reviving his deceased friends with the 100 point reward option. A new team of Gantz players is assembled, which Kurono leads, as the most experienced veteran and one of the best fighters. In the Oni mission it is shown that with Kurono's "will to live" he becomes the most ferocious Gantz hunter in the team. Through his interactions with the other members of the team and his life or death battles, Kurono gradually grows into a responsible leader. After the Oni mission Kato is revived by Kurono, and soon after Kurono meets his demise against the vampires. As the series goes on, the rules of the missions change; they can now be seen by regular people, the aliens they encounter are increasingly more powerful and dangerous, and they participate in a mission with another Gantz team from Osaka. Kato becomes the center of attention in the manga and his quest to revive Kurono. In a desperate attempt to revive his best friend, Kato fights the one hundred point alien Nurarihyon which obliterates both Osaka and Kurono's team. At the end of the mission, similar to the first time Kato died, he defeats arguably the strongest alien in the series and is laid bleeding on the floor. The series depicts both the missions and Kurono's regular life, as well as the daily lives of other Gantz players (to a lesser extent).

After several missions, an old participant named Nishi, who knows more than the others about how Gantz works, shows them a "catastrophe countdown" on the Gantz sphere which the other players were unaware of. The countdown reveals that there is one week left until some unknown "catastrophe." At the end of that week, a massive alien force invades the Earth and begins exterminating the human race, while Kurono and his companions try their best to make use of Gantz' advanced technology and weaponry in defense. At the end, Nishi and Kurono are depicted to be similar, both of whom were despised by their family and were sinister; however, unlike Nishi, Kurono has a reason to live. Nishi, in the chapter "The Great Escape", is left for dead by Kurono, vowing vengeance against him and crying out for Gantz and mother for help. It is hinted that Nishi died, but his death seems to be unclear. The Japanese also learn of the existence of Gantz teams all around the world. After a long battle, the humans manage to stop the alien invasion and soon after, it is revealed that it was another, highly advanced alien species that provided mankind with the means to defend itself against the invaders, for reasons they refuse to reveal, calling it a whim. In a desperate last effort, the leader of the alien forces, Eeva, challenges the whole human race, promising to exterminate every inhabitant by himself by crashing their mother ship, killing both races if Kurono does not come to their mother ship to fight him. Prior to this announcement Eeva completely dominates all Gantz teams in his vicinity by killing all the hunters, giving the human race a sense of their mortality. The world calls on Kurono, which is broadcast to the entire world, and, with a revived Kato's help, Kurono bets all his chance of winning and saving the human race on himself. Kurono manages to defeat Eeva, thus preventing the alien mothership from destroying Earth. The series ends with Kurono and Kato returning safely to Earth and being greeted as heroes.

Production
Hiroya Oku first thought of Gantzs story when he was in high school. He was inspired by the jidaigeki program Hissatsu, and the Robert Sheckley novel Time Killer. However, he did not decide to make Gantz until after writing the manga Zero One; Zero One had a similar setting, but Oku ended the series, noting it was not very entertaining and that it was too expensive to develop.

When creating the chapters for the manga, Oku starts with a thumbnail of the pages. He then creates 3D models of the characters and backgrounds on his computer. Once done, Oku prints the characters and backgrounds he made in 3D, adds tone and color to the pages, and finishes with sound effects and dialogue. He had already used this style in Zero One, but for that title, there was little work in hand drawing; Oku decided to add more hand drawing to give Gantz a more realistic tone as well as reduce the budget. However, he still notes that such a method is time-consuming and that he has to work quickly in order to finish the chapters on time.

Oku tries to incorporate realism into Gantz and adds that some of the events occurring in the story are based on his opinions regarding the world. During violent or erotic scenes, Oku makes sure to not make them very long to avoid reducing the series' realism. However, he has mentioned that he does not autocensor and that all the drawings he has ever illustrated have been published in the manga. Some plot twists are meant to go against common events that happen in several manga such as the deaths of the major characters like Kei Kishimoto and Masaru Kato. Before the series started serialization, Oku told his assistants that with Kurono's exception, all the major characters from the series would die.

Media

Manga

Gantz, written and illustrated by Hiroya Oku, debuted in Shueisha's seinen manga magazine Weekly Young Jump on June 29, 2000. Gantz is divided into three main story arcs, referred to as "phases". After the completion of phase one (first 237 chapters) on July 20, 2006, the author put the series on hiatus for a short time to work on phase two (chapters 238–303), which was serialized from November 22, 2006, to July 2, 2009. The third and final phase (chapters 303–383) started on October 1, 2009, and the series finished after about 13 years of publication on June 20, 2013. Shueisha collected its chapters in thirty-seven tankōbon volumes, released from December 11, 2000, to August 19, 2013.

In North America, publishing company Dark Horse Comics acquired the licensing rights for the release of English translations of Gantz on July 1, 2007, during the Anime Expo. The thirty-seven volumes were published between June 25, 2008, and October 28, 2015.

Spin-offs

Gantz/Osaka, showing the stories of the Gantz Osaka team, has been published in Japan in 2010 and compiled in 3 volumes released by Shueisha between October 20 and December 17, 2010. A special chapter Gantz no Moto that has Hiroya Oku telling the story on how he got into the manga business and what films influenced him was published in Miracle Jump on January 13, 2011. A one-shot chapter Gantz/Nishi, showing the life of Nishi, was published in Weekly Young Jump on May 12, 2011.

A spin-off, titled Gantz G, was serialized in Shueisha's Miracle Jump magazine from November 17, 2015 to March 2017 (the final chapter was published in Shonen Jump+ digital magazine). The manga was written by Oku and illustrated by Keita Iizuka. Dark Horse have also licensed the spin-off.

An historical spin-off of Gantz titled Gantz: E, written by Oku and illustrated by Jin Kagetsu started in Weekly Young Jump on January 9, 2020. The series is being published monthly in the magazine.

Anime

The series aired for two seasons, labeled as "stages"; the first stage was broadcast for eleven episodes (of originally thirteen) on Fuji TV from April 13 to June 22, 2004. The first stage aired on Fuji TV with several scenes censored, due to content that were deemed inappropriate, such as violence or nudity. However, the DVDs from the series contained the scenes uncensored. The second stage was broadcast for thirteen episodes on AT-X from August 26 to November 18, 2004. The episodes were collected in twelve DVDs, released by Shochiku, from August 25, 2004, to June 29, 2005.

In North America, ADV Films announced that they had licensed the series in 2004. It was released in uncut form, retaining the violence and nudity previously censored in Japan for broadcast. Ten DVDs were released from February 8, 2005, to January 17, 2006; The series began broadcast in Anime Network in 2005. In June 2010, Funimation announced that they had acquired the rights to the series; they released a complete DVD set on January 25, 2011.

Gantz: O, a 3D CGI animated film based on the series, was released in 2016.

Video game
On March 17, 2005, Konami published a game for the PlayStation 2 in Japan named simply as Gantz: The Game. It features the characters and plot up to the Chibi Alien mission. The game mixes third-person shooter and role-playing game (RPG) elements together. The game also includes extras including Free Play mode, a Mini Mode, Magazine Browser mode, Gantz Rankings, a special preview movie and the scenario completion statistic.

Novel
A novel, titled Gantz/Minus, written by Masatoshi Kusakabe and illustrated by Yusuke Kozaki, started serialization in Weekly Young Jump on July 23, 2009, being the first time that a novel was serialized in the magazine. It takes place before the events of the manga, with the focus being on the characters Shion Izumi and Joichiro Nishi, who participate in Gantz's missions. It was later released as a collected volume on May 19, 2010.

Another novel, titled Gantz/EXA, planned by Yumeaki Hirayama, written by Junjo Shindo and illustrated by Koji Ogata, began serialization in Weekly Young Jump on September 16, 2010. It was later released as a collected volume on January 19, 2011.

Live-action films

On November 24, 2009, it was announced that two live-action Gantz films were in production. The films star Kazunari Ninomiya and Kenichi Matsuyama in the roles of Kurono and Kato respectively, and were directed by Shinsuke Sato. The films were released in January and April 2011.

The first film, titled simply as Gantz, was released in Japan on January 29, 2011. A special North American screening took place on January 20, 2011, during which the film was simulcast in theaters across 46 states. At the end of this special Los Angeles showing, which took place at the Mann's Chinese 6 theatre, there was a discussion and live interview with both the male leads, as well as a teaser trailer for the second installment, Gantz: Perfect Answer, which was released in Japan on April 23, 2011. Gantz and Gantz: Perfect Answer were screened in San Diego, California as part of Comic-Con International at the Gaslamp 15 Theater on July 22 & 23.

In May 2020, it was reported that Sony Pictures is adapting Gantz with writer Marc Guggenheim. In November 2021, it was announced that Julius Avery was hired to direct the film.

Other
A companion book titled Gantz/Manual was published by Shueisha on December 17, 2004. The book features episode summaries, character overviews, and additional background details on the Gantz universe. A revised edition, Gantz/Manual Remix, was published in 2011 as a supplement for Gantz manga and live-action film featuring story act summaries, manga story arc summaries, character overviews, and additional background details on the Gantz universe.

Reception
Japanese sales from the Gantz manga have led several of the volumes to be featured in lists of best seller volumes from Japan. As of November 2010, the Gantz manga had sold over ten million units in Japan, while during January 2011 the sales increased to over fifteen million volumes. As of June 2013, the manga had reportedly sold 20 million copies.

During 2008, Dark Horse Comics announced that the Gantz series had sold 175,000 copies in America. Volume 4 of the manga reached eighth place on The New York Times "Manga Best Seller List". About.com's Deb Aoki listed Gantz as the best new seinen of 2008 along with Black Lagoon.

DVD sales of Gantz have been particularly strong. According to Anime News Network, Gantz volume three surpassed DVD sales of its predecessor, volume one, by a significant margin. Owing to strong DVD sales, ADV films has continuously released successive volumes and it was one of the most successful anime franchises of 2005. Christopher MacDonald of Anime News Network called it one of Japan's favorite TV anime in October 2006.

The Gantz anime has been described as being extremely "violent", "gory" and "sadistic" and yet is also very "addictive", even when it was censored during broadcast.

Notes

References

Further reading

External links
Official Gantz: The Game website 

Gantz
Action anime and manga
ADV Films
Alien invasions in comics
AT-X (TV network) original programming
Comics about death
Dark Horse Comics titles
Fiction about death games
Extraterrestrials in anime and manga
Fuji TV original programming
Funimation
Gonzo (company)
Madman Entertainment anime
Manga adapted into films
Psychological horror anime and manga
Psychological thriller anime and manga
Science fiction anime and manga
Seinen manga
Sharp Point Press titles
Shueisha franchises
Shueisha manga
Teleportation in fiction